Gene or Eugene Lyons may refer to:

Eugene Lyons (1898–1985), American journalist and political biographer
Gene Lyons (actor) (1921–1974), American member of Ironside cast
Gene Lyons (born 1943), American political columnist